Geronimo Trail Scenic Byway is a US National Scenic Byway commemorating Chiricahua Apache warrior Geronimo. The road is also recognized by the New Mexico Department of Transportation as a scenic and historic byway. The town of Truth or Consequences, New Mexico lies at the center of this trail with a southern end at San Lorenzo, Grant County, New Mexico and a northern end at Beaverhead Ranger Station.

Geronimo Trail incorporates several New Mexico state highways passing along Elephant Butte Dam, Elephant Butte Lake State Park, Caballo Lake, Caballo Mountains and Black Range Mountains. It is connected to the Trail of the Mountain Spirits Scenic Byway in the southwest and El Camino Real De Tierra Adentro in the northeast. From Truth or Consequences north, there are Elephant Butte, New Mexico, Cuchillo, Winston and Chloride.

References  

Roads in New Mexico
Historic trails and roads in New Mexico
Scenic byways in New Mexico
New Mexico Scenic and Historic Byways
Interstate 25